Luis de Vargas (1502–1568) was a Spanish painter of the late-Renaissance period, active mainly in Seville. He traveled to Rome where he was influenced by Mannerist styles. He painted an altarpiece with multiple panels, including a Virgin and Child appearing to Adam and Eve or La Gamba for the Cathedral in Seville. He frescoed a Last Judgement for the Casa de Misericordia in Seville. Francisco Venegas was a student of his.

References
The Paintings of Francisco de Herrera, The Elder, by John S. Thacher. The Art Bulletin (1937); page 326–327.

1502 births
1568 deaths
Spanish Renaissance painters
Painters from Seville
16th-century Spanish painters
Spanish male painters
Catholic painters